Thorium monoxide (thorium(II) oxide), is the binary oxide of thorium having chemical formula ThO. The covalent bond in this diatomic molecule is highly polar. The effective electric field between the two atoms has been calculated to be about 80 gigavolts per centimeter, one of the largest known internal effective electric fields.

Simple combustion of thorium in air produces thorium dioxide. However, laser ablation of thorium in the presence of oxygen gives the monoxide. Additionally, exposure of a thin film of thorium to low-pressure oxygen at medium temperature forms a rapidly growing layer of thorium monoxide under a more-stable surface coating of the dioxide.

At extremely high temperatures, thorium dioxide can convert to the monoxide either by a comproportionation reaction (equilibrium with liquid thorium metal) above  or by simple dissociation (evolution of oxygen) above .
ThO2 + Th(l) <=> 2 ThO(s)
ThO2 -> ThO(s) + 1/2 O2

References 

Oxides
Thorium compounds
Rock salt crystal structure